Spatial intelligence may refer to:
Spatial intelligence (business method)
Spatial intelligence (psychology)